Standish O'Grady may refer to:

 Standish O'Grady, 1st Viscount Guillamore (1766-1840), Lord Chief Baron of the Exchequer in Ireland
 Standish O'Grady, 2nd Viscount Guillamore (1792–1848), Anglo-Irish politician and British Army officer
 Standish O'Grady (poet) (before 1793-1846?), Irish-Canadian poet and priest
 Standish James O'Grady (1846–1928), Irish historical novelist and literary historian
 Standish Hayes O'Grady (1832–1915), Irish antiquarian